Besnard is a surname. Notable people with the surname include:

Armand Besnard
Charlotte Besnard (1854 –1931), born Charlotte Dubray, a French sculptor
David Besnard (born 1977), Australian racing driver
Florent Besnard
Lucien Besnard
Marie Besnard (1896–1980), French poisoner
Paul-Albert Besnard (1849–1934), French painter
Philippe Besnard (1885-1971), French sculptor
Pierre Besnard
René Besnard
Wladimir Besnard (1890-1960), French biologist and oceanographer

See also 

 Benard

French-language surnames

nl:Besnard